The 1944 New Hampshire gubernatorial election was held on November 7, 1944. Republican nominee Charles M. Dale defeated Democratic nominee James J. Powers with 53.11% of the vote.

Primary elections
Primary elections were held on July 11, 1944.

Republican primary

Candidates
Charles M. Dale, Mayor of Portsmouth
Robert O. Blood, incumbent Governor

Results

General election

Candidates
Charles M. Dale, Republican
James J. Powers, Democratic

Results

References

1944
New Hampshire
Gubernatorial